Lee Margerison (born 10 September 1973) is an English former professional footballer who played as a midfielder.

Career
Born in Bradford, Margerison made three appearances in the Football League for Bradford City, and later played non-league football for Slough Town.

After football
In May 2010, Margerison was one of seven former football professionals who undertook a 140-mile charity bike ride, in memory of a University friend who died of leukaemia. The other riders included Tony Strudwick, Chris Jones, Tom Curtis, Liam Kane, Joe Whibley and Chris Kerr.

Margerison now works as a teacher at St Aidan's Church of England High School in Harrogate.

References

1973 births
Living people
English footballers
Bradford City A.F.C. players
Slough Town F.C. players
English Football League players
Association football midfielders